Talbragar Shire was a local government area in the Orana region of New South Wales, Australia.

Talbragar Shire was proclaimed on 7 March 1906. The New South Wales State Heritage-listed Talbragar Shire Council Chambers are located in the city of Dubbo.

Talbragar Shire was absorbed into the City of Dubbo on 1 March 1980.

References

Former local government areas of New South Wales
1906 establishments in Australia
1980 disestablishments in Australia